Bernd Hofmann (23 November 1904 – 4 December 1940) was a German screenwriter and film director. He wrote and directed the 1940 film Journey to Life The same year he died after complications from dental surgery. Before his death he had been regarded as a rising German director.

Selected filmography

Screenwriter
 A Woman of No Importance (1936)
 Mother Song (1937)
The Chief Witness (1937)
 All Lies (1938)
 Yvette (1938)
 The Leghorn Hat (1939)

Director
 Mistake of the Heart (1939)
 Journey to Life (1940)

References

External links

Bibliography 
 Giesen, Rolf. Nazi Propaganda Films: A History and Filmography. McFarland & Company 2003.

1904 births
1940 deaths
Film people from North Rhine-Westphalia
People from Elberfeld
Mass media people from Wuppertal